The Reluctant Debutante may refer to:
The Reluctant Debutante (play), a 1955 play by William Douglas-Home
The Reluctant Debutante (film), a 1958 film starring Rex Harrison